The Calgary Canadian Irish Athletic Club (CCIAC) is a sports club based in the northeast of Calgary, Alberta.

The club runs a number of rugby union and field hockey teams for both men and women as well as a number of junior programs.

History
The club was founded in 1971.  The idea of forming a rugby football club based on the Irish community in Calgary was conceived by Derrick Wright and Jim Sullivan to name but two. It was decided not to confine the club's activities to rugby, but to promote other amateur sports, to improve and maintain the moral, intellectual, physical and social qualities of its members and to stimulate good citizenship and friendship.

The club has been committed to being a premier outdoor athletic club in Calgary ever since 1971, and one of the most successful rugby programs in Western Canada.

CCIAC Senior Men Players who have represented Canada at the Rugby World Cup
Julian Loveday (1999) 
Quinten Fyffe (2003) 
Ryan Smith (2007, 2011)

Highlights
In 1973 a ladies field hockey section of the club was formed. 
In 1993 the club was the first rugby club in Calgary to open its own clubhouse and playing fields, complete with 2 full size rugby pitches and 2 field hockey pitches.
In 1999 a Women's Rugby team joined the club to form one of the best women's rugby programs in Canada. 
In 2003 the club became the first rugby club in Calgary to open an indoor gym.
In 2011 all three senior men's rugby teams qualified for playoffs. 
In 2011 the 2nd division team won the provincial championship by beating the Norwesters 16-12.

Senior rugby
The club fields three senior men's teams (Alberta cup, Calgary 2nd & 3rd division).

Junior programs
The CCIAC runs a number of junior programs for all age groups.

Mixed mini rugby (U7, U9)
Boys junior rugby (U11, U13, U15, U17, U19)
Girls junior rugby (U15, U19)
Junior girls field hockey

Clubhouse and grounds
The clubhouse and grounds are located in the northeast of Calgary.  The club maintains two full rugby fields, a practice field and two field hockey pitches, as well as a fully licensed clubhouse, changing facilities, gym and athletic treatment room.

Though stocking a proper bar and food service area. The Calgary Irish have been known for running out of beer. This is a reoccurring problem.

See also
Calgary Chieftains

References

External links
Club website
Calgary Ladies Field Hockey Association website

Rugby union teams in Alberta
Canadian field hockey clubs
Sports clubs established in 1971
1971 establishments in Alberta